Gary Robert Mara (9 August 1962 – 21 August 2012) was an Australian professional rugby league footballer who played in the 1980s. The son of Bob Mara, he played for Balmain Tigers in the 1982 NSWRL season, and for Parramatta Eels in the 1984 NSWRL season. 
 
After leaving rugby league, he worked at his family's pub, the Unity Hall Hotel in Balmain.

Mara died while holidaying with his family in Los Angeles, when he and his daughter were struck by a speeding drunk driver as they crossed a road. The driver, model Cara Cameron, was charged with murder and vehicular manslaughter. In a plea deal Cameron pleaded 'no contest' to "vehicular manslaughter while intoxicated". She will serve four years' jail, and pay 100,000 to the Mara family.

References

1962 births
2012 deaths
Australian rugby league players
Rugby league players from Sydney
Balmain Tigers players
Parramatta Eels players
Road incident deaths in California
Pedestrian road incident deaths
Manslaughter victims